Elections were held in Calabarzon for seats in the House of Representatives of the Philippines on May 13, 2013.

The candidate with the most votes won that district's seat for the 16th Congress of the Philippines.

Summary

Antipolo

1st District
Roberto Puno is the incumbent.

2nd District
Romeo Acop is the incumbent.

Batangas

1st District
Tomas Apacible is the incumbent. His primary opponent is former Representative Eileen Ermita-Buhain

2nd District
Incumbent Hermilando Mandanas, who had earlier resigned from the Liberal Party is term limited. The Liberals nominated actor and incumbent board member Christopher de Leon, with the United Nationalist Alliance nominating former Board Member Godofredo Berberabe. Berberabe died on March 4, 2013. The Running of Godofredo Berberabe is continued by his brother, Danilo Berberabe.

3rd District
Nelson Collantes is the incumbent. His opponents are former Representative Victoria Hernandez-Reyes, Tanauan Mayor Sonia Torres-Aquino and Nicomedes Hernandez

4th District
Mark L. Mendoza is the incumbent. His opponent is Bernadette Sabili, wife of incumbent Lipa Mayor Meynardo Sabili.

Cavite

1st District
Incumbent Joseph Emilio Abaya resigned on October 18, 2012, in order to be the Secretary of Transportation and Communications. The seat is presently vacant up to election day. His brother, Francis Gerald is his party's nominee. Former Kawit mayor Fedrerico Poblete is his opponent, with movie director and activist Joel Lamangan withdrawing at the race.

2nd District (Bacoor)
Lani Mercado is the incumbent.

3rd District (Imus)
Incumbent Erineo Maliksi is running for the governorship; his party nominated former board member Alex Advincula.

4th District (Dasmariñas)
Incumbent Elpidio Barzaga of the National Unity Party is also nominated by the Liberal Party.

5th District
Roy Loyola is the incumbent.

6th District
Antonio Ferrer is running for mayor of General Trias. His brother, incumbent General Trias Mayor Luis "Jon Jon" Ferrer IV is his party's nominee. His opponent is former Vice Governor Dencito Campaña.

7th District
Incumbent Jesus Crispin Remulla is term limited; his brother former Representative Gilbert Remulla is his party's nominee. His primary opponent is Abraham Tolentino, incumbent Mayor of Tagaytay and brother of Metropolitan Manila Development Authority Chairman Francis Tolentino

Laguna

1st District
Danilo Ramon Fernandez is the incumbent.

2nd District

Incumbent Timmy Chipeco is term limited; his father, Calamba mayor Jun Chipeco, Jr., is his party's nominee. His opponent is former governor Teresita Lazaro

3rd District
Maria Evita Arago is the incumbent. She will oppose former ABS-CBN News anchor/reporter Sol Aragones.

4th District
Incumbent Edgar San Luis is running for the governorship. His Liberal Party, named Benjamin Agarao Jr. as their nominee in this district.

Quezon

1st District
Wilfredo Mark Enverga is the incumbent.

2nd District
Incumbent Irvin Alcala is running for the governorship; his uncle, Vice Governor Vicente Alcala, is his party's nominee. His opponents are former congresswoman Lynette Punzalan, Keigoutina Suarez, Lucena Mayor Barbara Ruby Talaga and Marivic Rivera

3rd District
Incumbent Danilo Suarez is term limited. His wife Aleta, is his party's nominee.

4th District
Incumbent Lorenzo Tañada III is term limited; his brother Wigberto is his party's nominee.

Rizal

1st District
Incumbent Joel Roy Duavit is running unopposed.

2nd District
Incumbent Isidro Rodriguez is running unopposed.

 
 
 
 

2013 Philippine general election
Lower house elections in Calabarzon